is a pre-dreadnought battleship built for the Imperial Japanese Navy (IJN) in the late 1890s. Named after Mount Mikasa in Nara, Japan, the ship served as the flagship of Vice Admiral Tōgō Heihachirō throughout the Russo-Japanese War of 1904–1905, including the Battle of Port Arthur on the second day of the war and the Battles of the Yellow Sea and Tsushima. Days after the end of the war, Mikasas magazine accidentally exploded and sank the ship. She was salvaged and her repairs took over two years to complete. Afterwards, the ship served as a coast-defence ship during World War I and supported Japanese forces during the Siberian Intervention in the Russian Civil War.

After 1922, Mikasa was decommissioned in accordance with the Washington Naval Treaty and preserved as a museum ship at Yokosuka. She was badly neglected during the post-World War II Occupation of Japan and required extensive refurbishing in the late 1950s. She has been partially restored, and is now a museum ship located at Mikasa Park in Yokosuka. Mikasa is the last remaining example of a pre-dreadnought battleship anywhere in the world and also the last example of a British-built battleship still existing.

Background

The combat experience of the lightly armoured Matsushima-class cruisers  during the First Sino-Japanese War of 1894–1895 convinced the Imperial Japanese Navy of weaknesses in the Jeune Ecole naval philosophy, and Japan embarked on a program to modernize and expand its fleet in preparation for further confrontations. In particular, Japan promulgated a ten-year naval build-up programme, with the construction of six battleships and six armoured cruisers at its core. These ships were paid for from the £30,000,000 indemnity paid by China after losing the First Sino-Japanese War.

As with the earlier  and s, Japan lacked the technology and capability to construct its own battleships, and turned again to the United Kingdom for the four remaining battleships of the programme. Mikasa, the last of these ships, was ordered from the Vickers shipyard in Barrow-in-Furness in 1898 at the cost of £880,000 (8.8 million yen at that time). Although she closely resembled several of the other ships ordered in this program, she was the only ship in her class.

Design and description

The design of Mikasa was a modified version of the s of the Royal Navy with two additional  guns. She displaced  at normal load. The crew numbered about 830 officers and enlisted men.

The ship was powered by two vertical triple-expansion steam engines, each driving one propeller, using steam generated by 25 Belleville boilers.

Mikasas main battery consisted of the same four Elswick Ordnance Company 40-calibre twelve-inch guns used in all of the preceding Japanese battleships. They were mounted in twin-gun barbettes fore and aft of the superstructure which were additionally protected with armoured hoods, thus resembling true gun turrets. The hydraulically powered mountings could be loaded at all angles of traverse while the guns were loaded at a fixed angle of +13.5°.

The ship's secondary armament consisted of fourteen 40-calibre  quick-firing guns mounted in casemates. Ten of these guns were positioned on the main deck and the other four guns were placed above them at the corners of the superstructure. Protection against torpedo boat attacks was provided by twenty QF 12-pounder 12 cwt guns. Lighter guns consisted of eight  three-pounder Hotchkiss guns and eight 47-millimetre 2.5-pounder Hotchkiss guns. The ship was also equipped with four submerged 18-inch torpedo tubes, two on each broadside.

The forward conning tower was protected by 14 inches of armour, but the aft conning tower only had four inches of armour.

In addition the ships were also fitted with 24-power magnification telescopic gunsights.

Construction and career

Mikasa, named after Mount Mikasa, was laid down by Vickers at their Barrow-in-Furness shipyard on 24 January 1899. Baroness (later Countess) Hayashi, the wife of the then resident minister to Great Britain (later Ambassador), served as Mikasa's sponsor, launching the hull on a rainy, but otherwise perfect ceremony on 8 November 1900. She would be completed on 1 March 1902, and after a visit to Devonport, she left Plymouth on 13 March, bound for Yokohama, under the command of Captain Hayasaki.

At the start of the Russo-Japanese War, Mikasa, commanded by Captain Hikojirō Ijichi, was assigned to the 1st Division of the 1st Fleet. She participated in the Battle of Port Arthur on 9 February 1904 when Admiral Tōgō Heihachirō led the 1st Fleet in an attack on the Russian ships of the Pacific Squadron anchored just outside Port Arthur. Tōgō had expected his surprise night attack on the Russians by his destroyers to be much more successful than it actually was and expected to find them badly disorganized and weakened, but the Russians had recovered from their surprise and were ready for his attack. The Japanese ships were spotted by the cruiser  which was patrolling offshore and alerted the Russian defences. Tōgō chose to attack the Russian coastal defences with his main armament and engage the Russian ships with his secondary guns. Splitting his fire proved to be a bad idea as the Japanese  and six-inch guns inflicted very little significant damage on the Russian ships who concentrated all their fire on the Japanese ships with some effect. Although a large number of ships on both sides were hit, Russian casualties numbered only 17 while the Japanese suffered 60 killed and wounded before Tōgō disengaged. Mikasa was hit by two ten-inch shells during the engagement that wounded seven crewmen.

The ship participated in the action of 13 April when Tōgō successfully lured out a portion of the Pacific Squadron, including Vice Admiral Stepan Makarov's flagship, the battleship . When Makarov spotted the five battleships of the 1st Division, he turned back for Port Arthur and Petropavlovsk struck a minefield laid by the Japanese the previous night. The Russian battleship sank in less than two minutes after one of her magazines exploded, and Makarov was one of the 677 killed. Emboldened by his success, Tōgō resumed long-range bombardment missions, which prompted the Russians to lay more minefields which sank two Japanese battleships the following month.

During the Battle of the Yellow Sea on 10 August, Mikasa was at the head of the column of Japanese battleships and was one of the primary targets of the Russian ships. She was hit twenty times, two of which knocked out her aft 12-inch gun turret, and suffered 125 casualties among her crew. In turn, she concentrated most of her fire upon the battleships  and  although both ships were only lightly damaged by the Japanese shells which generally failed to penetrate any armour and detonated on impact.

Battle of Tsushima

At the Battle of Tsushima on 27 May 1905, Mikasa again led the 1st Fleet into combat, this time against the Second and Third Pacific Squadrons detached from the Baltic Fleet. The ship opened fire at the battleship , the Russian flagship, at 14:10, and was joined by the battleship  and the armoured cruiser  shortly afterwards. Within an hour the Japanese ships had started a serious fire aboard the Russian ship, badly wounded the fleet commander, Vice Admiral Zinovy Rozhestvensky, knocked out her rear twelve-inch gun turret, and jammed Knyaz Suvorovs steering so that she fell out of formation. During this time, Mikasa was the focus of the Russian fire as the leading ship in the Japanese column and was hit by 6 twelve-inch and 19 six-inch shells. They did very little damage and Tōgō was able to cross the T of the Russian squadrons. Knyaz Suvorovs steering was later repaired, but she blundered between the Japanese and Russian fleets several times later in the battle and Mikasa fired three torpedoes at her to no avail. Later in the battle, the ship appears to have fired mostly on the battleship  although  fired the shots that caused the Russian ship's magazines to explode and sink her. At 18:04, a twelve-inch shell detonated prematurely in the barrel of the right gun of the forward turret, disabling the gun and knocking out the left gun until 18:40. Another twelve-inch shell had exploded in that same barrel almost two hours earlier, but had not damaged the gun. One six-inch gun jammed after firing 19 rounds, but the only other damage to any of the ship's guns was one six-inch gun that was disabled by a Russian shell of the same size that entered through the gun port. She fired 124 twelve-inch shells during the battle, more than any other ship except Asahis 142. In total, Mikasa was hit more than 40 times during the battle, including 10 twelve-inch and 22 six-inch shells, but none of them seriously damaged her. While Mikasa suffered 113 personnel casualties, the entire Japanese force combined only lost 117 men killed and 583 wounded to all causes during the battle.

Six days after the Treaty of Portsmouth that ended the war was signed, Mikasa sank at her moorings after a fire and magazine explosion at Sasebo on the night of 11/12 September 1905 that killed 251 crewmen. She was refloated on 7 August 1906, reconstructed and repaired at Sasebo Naval Arsenal. The navy took the opportunity to upgrade her existing armament with more powerful 45-calibre twelve-inch and six-inch guns during the two years it took to repair the ship. Mikasa was restored to active service on 24 August 1908.  In 1912, Mikasa came extremely close to suffering another main magazine detonation, when a suicidal sailor attempted to blow her up at anchor near Kobe.  During World War I, she served on coast-defence duties, based at Maizuru, during 1914–15 and was then assigned to the Second and Fifth Squadrons, in that order, for the rest of the war. The ship supported the Japanese intervention in Siberia during the Russian Civil War during 1921 and was reclassified on 1 September 1921 as a first-class coast-defence ship. On 17 September, Mikasa ran aground near Askold Island off Vladivostok, but was not seriously damaged.

Preservation

The ship was decommissioned on 23 September 1923 following the Washington Naval Treaty of 1922 and scheduled for destruction. However, at the request of the Japanese government, each of the signatory countries to the treaty agreed that Mikasa could be preserved as a memorial ship with her hull encased in concrete. On 12 November 1926, Mikasa was opened for display in Yokosuka in the presence of Crown Prince Hirohito and Tōgō. Following the surrender of Japan in 1945, the ship deteriorated under control of the occupation forces. In 1955, American businessman John Rubin, formerly of Barrow, England, wrote a letter to the Japan Times about the state of the ship, which was the catalyst for a new restoration campaign. With the support of the Japanese public, and also Fleet Admiral Chester W. Nimitz, the restored battleship reopened in 1961. Mikasa is the only surviving example of a pre-dreadnought battleship in the world.

Mikasa is remembered in Barrow-in-Furness, the town of its construction, by Mikasa Street on Walney Island.

See also

 , a surviving Russian warship of the Battle of Tsushima
 , a U.S. Navy protected cruiser preserved in Philadelphia
 USS Texas, sole surviving dreadnought battleship
 , the only armored cruiser still afloat

Notes

Footnotes

References

External links

 A photo tour of Mikasa
 4/2/1904;Admiral Togo's Flagship Mikasa Leading the Japanese Fleet Into Action
 Mikasa Official Website (Japanese)
 Mikasa Official Website (English)

Existing battleships
Battleships of the Imperial Japanese Navy
Vickers
Ships built in Barrow-in-Furness
1900 ships
Maritime incidents in 1905
Ships sunk by non-combat internal explosions
World War I battleships of Japan
Museum ships in Japan
Russo-Japanese War battleships of Japan
Museums in Kanagawa Prefecture
Buildings and structures in Yokosuka, Kanagawa
Victorian-era battleships of the United Kingdom
Tōgō Heihachirō